Salt Lake Valley is a  valley in Salt Lake County in the north-central portion of the U.S. state of Utah. It contains Salt Lake City and many of its suburbs, notably Murray, Sandy, South Jordan, West Jordan, and West Valley City; its total population is 1,029,655 as of 2010. Brigham Young said, "this is the right place," when he and his fellow Mormon settlers moved into Utah after being driven out of several states.

Geography
The Valley is surrounded in every direction except the northwest by steep mountains that at some points rise  from the valley floor's base elevation. It lies nearly encircled by the Wasatch Mountains on the east, the Oquirrh Mountains on the west, Traverse Ridge to the south and the Great Salt Lake on the northwest, with the peaks of Antelope Island visible.

Every entrance into the valley is extremely narrow and often congested. They include the Point of the Mountain to the south via the Jordan Narrows, a gap in the Traverse Mountains, narrow entrances between the Great Salt Lake and Oquirrh Mountains to the northwest and the Great Salt Lake and the Wasatch Mountains to the north, and several canyons to the east including Parley's Canyon and Emigration Canyon.

Flowing from Utah Lake in Utah Valley in the south, the Jordan River runs north through a gap in the Traverse Mountains, bisecting the Valley before emptying into the Great Salt Lake. The Jordan River, along with numerous mountain streams and reservoirs, provides irrigation water to the rapidly growing Valley.

The geography of the Salt Lake Valley combined with the prevalence of industrial pollution and to some extent, fossil fuel burning vehicles, leads to poor air quality in Utah.

Development
The only areas that have not been urbanized in Salt Lake Valley are near the Great Salt Lake (prevented by frequent flooding) and in the far west and mid-southwest parts of the Valley, although even those areas are beginning to experience the effects of the Salt Lake City urban area's rapid expansion. This southwestern expansion is typified and will be facilitated by the Mountain View Corridor.  Some experts are claiming that the Valley will be urbanized rim-to-rim within the next 50 years.

A company known as Kennecott Land, which owns the eastern foothills of the Oquirrhs in the western part of the valley, recently drafted a plan that would develop the rest of the entire valley within 75 years, adding at least 500,000 residents. The first development, known as the Daybreak Community, has substantial portions already completed but continues construction. It will focus on transit-oriented development (it already has service by TRAX light rail and will also feature a ski resort in the Oquirrh Mountains and a university campus).

Interstate 15 runs north to south through the middle-eastern portion of the Valley and Interstate 80 runs east to west in the northern quarter of the Valley from Parley's Canyon into Tooele County to the west (where it cuts across a small portion of the Great Salt Lake). The Interstate 215 belt route, State Route 154 (Bangerter Highway), State Route 201 (21st South Freeway), and State Route 85 (Mountain View Corridor) are also major transportation routes. The Utah Transit Authority operates an extensive bus system across the Wasatch Front, including the Salt Lake Valley, in addition to three light rail lines (known as TRAX) in the Valley. A commuter rail line known as FrontRunner runs north to Pleasant View in Weber County and south to Provo in Utah County.

See also

 Mormon Trail
 Salt Lake County, Utah

References

Geography of Salt Lake City
Valleys of Utah
Wasatch Front
Landforms of Salt Lake County, Utah
Valleys of the Great Basin